Rafael García Bárcena (June 7, 1908 Guines, Cuba - June 13, 1964) was a Cuban philosopher who later took a leading role in the Cuban Revolution against President Fulgencio Batista. A Professor of Philosophy, he founded the National Revolutionary Movement (Movimiento Nacional Revolucionaria – MNR). Consisting largely of middle-class members, it contrasted with Fidel Castro's predominantly working class support base, the 26th of July Movement. In March 1953, the MNR had planned to attack and seize control of the barracks at Camp Colombia, but police had been alerted to the plot, with the conspirators being rounded up and tortured. In all, fourteen people were sentenced to imprisonment for the attack.

References

Footnotes

Bibliography

 
 
 

Cuban revolutionaries
Cuban philosophers
20th-century Cuban philosophers
Year of birth missing
Year of death missing